H.-S. Philip Wong is the Willard R. and Inez Kerr Bell professor in the School of Engineering, Professor of Electrical Engineering at Stanford University. He is a Chinese-American electrical engineer whose career centers on nanotechnology, microelectronics, and semiconductor technology.

Biography
H.-S. Philip Wong completed his B.Sc. (Hons) in Electrical Engineering at University of Hong Kong in 1982. He received his MS (1983) in Electrical Engineering from State University of New York, Stony Brook, and his PhD (1988) in Electrical Engineering from Lehigh University, under the tutelage of Professor Marvin H. White.

After completing his doctoral degree, he joined the IBM Thomas J. Watson Research Center at Yorktown Heights, New York, in 1988. At IBM, he held various positions from Research Staff Member to Senior Manager. He joined Stanford University as Professor of Electrical Engineering in September 2004.

In 2019, he received the IEEE Electron Devices Society J.J. Ebers Award, the Society’s highest honor to recognize outstanding technical contributions to the field of electron devices that have made a lasting impact.

In 2018, he took a leave of absence from Stanford to serve as Vice President of Corporate Research at Taiwan Semiconductor Manufacturing Company (NYSE: STM, Taiwan Stock Exchange: 2330), the largest semiconductor foundry in the world.

Other academic appointments
Hong Kong Polytechnic University, Hong Kong: Visiting Chair Professor of Nanoelectronics
Institute of Microelectronics, Chinese Academy of Sciences, Beijing, China: Honorary Professor
Peking University, Beijing, China: Visiting Professor
IMEP-LAHC, Grenoble, France: Chair of Excellence (Chaire d’Excellence de la Fondation Nanosciences)
Hong Kong University of Science and Technology, Hong Kong: Visiting Professor

Awards and honors

 2012, Honorary Doctorate Degree (Docteur Honoris Causa), Grenoble Institute of Technology (Institut Polytechnique de Grenoble), France 
 2001, Fellow, IEEE 
 2019, IEEE Electron Devices Society, J.J. Ebers Award

Published
 H.-S. P. Wong and D. Akinwande, “Carbon Nanotube and Graphene Device Physics,” Cambridge University Press, 2011.  ().

References

External links
  Google Scholar	
 Research profile at Stanford

Year of birth missing (living people)
Living people
Chinese electrical engineers
Stanford University Department of Electrical Engineering faculty
Stanford University School of Engineering faculty
Electrical engineering academics
Fellow Members of the IEEE
Faculty